Toulicia is a genus of flowering plants belonging to the family Sapindaceae.

Its native range is South America.

Species:
 Toulicia bullata Radlk. 
 Toulicia crassifolia Radlk.

References

Sapindaceae
Sapindaceae genera